is a member of the Japanese idol girl group SKE48. She is a former member of HKT48's Team KIV and now currently a member of SKE48's Team E. She is represented by Watanabe Entertainment.

Career 
Tani passed HKT48's second generation auditions on 23 June 2012. Her debut was on 23 September 2012 at HKT48's Team H stage performance. Her debut stage performance was on 30 September 2012, at HKT48's Kenkyusei Stage.

Tani was first selected for HKT48's general election for the single Melon Juice. On 11 January 2014, Tani was promoted to newly formed Team KIV during HKT48's Concert. However, in February 2014, during the AKB48 Group Shuffle, it was announced she would be transferred to SKE48's Team E. Her last HKT48 activity was on 21 April 2014, during the last day of HKT48's Kenkyusei Stage. She started activities as a Team E member in May 2014.

After her transfer to SKE48, Tani featured on two A-sides, "12 Gatsu no Kangaroo" and "Coquettish Jūtai Chū". In 2015, 
she participated in the AKB48 41st single general election, and ranked 23rd with 26,051 votes. It was her first ever ranking.

Discography

SKE48 singles

HKT48 singles

AKB48 singles

Appearances

Stage units
HKT48 Kenkyusei Stage 
 "Classmate"
HKT48 Himawarigumi Stage 
 
HKT48 Kenkyusei Stage 
 
SKE48 Team E 4th Stage

TV variety
 
 (2014)
 (2014－2015)

TV dramas
  (2013)
  (2013)
  (2015), KY
  (2015), KY

Radio
  (2014), personality
  (2015－), assistant

References

External links
 SKE48 Official Profile 
 Official Blog  
 Marika Tani on Google+ 

1996 births
Living people
Japanese idols
Japanese women pop singers
Musicians from Fukuoka Prefecture
SKE48 members
HKT48 members
Watanabe Entertainment